Glory Glory is a 2000 western film. The film was also marketed under the title Hooded Angels.

Synopsis
It is the dawn of the Wild West in Silver Creek. A gang of beautiful but deadly women have unleashed violence on the society that failed to protect them, robbing banks and destroying everything in their path. A posse is sent after these masked raiders, not knowing whom they are chasing nor the fate that will await them - for bringing these female vigilantes to justice will unleash a surprising past and a new future for all.

Cast
 Amanda Donohoe as Widow
 Steven Bauer as Jack
 Paul Johansson as Wes
 Gary Busey as Sheriff
 Chantell Stander as Hannah
 Juliana Venter as Ellie
 David Dukas as Billy
 Gideon Emery as Sil
 Jenna Dover as Jane
 Julie Hartley as April
 Candice Argall as Becky
 Jennifer Steyn as Christa
 Ana Alexander as Marie (Credited as Anna Katerina)
 Michelle Bradshaw as Sherrie

References

External links

2000 films
English-language South African films
2000 Western (genre) films
South African Western (genre) films
2000s English-language films
Films directed by Paul Matthews